Sir William Hale-White  (7 November 1857 – 26 February 1949) was a British physician and medical biographer.

He was the son of writer Mark Rutherford.

Career
Hale-White was appointed an assistant physician at Guy's Hospital in 1886, a physician in 1890 and consulting physician from 1917. During the First World War, he was a colonel in the RAMC and was created KBE in 1919.

He was elected president of the Medical Society of London (1920–), the Royal Society of Medicine (1922–1924) and of the Association of Physicians of Great Britain and Ireland (1930).

Retirement 
Hale-White remained active in history of medicine following retirement. In this field, he is best known for his categorising of William Withering's letters, bequeathed by William Osler to The History of Medicine Society at The Royal Society of Medicine, London. His literary contributions also include works on René Laennec and John Keats.

Family life
In 1886, Hale-White married Edith Fripp the daughter of Alfred Downing Fripp and sister of Sir Alfred Fripp, surgeon to Edward VII and George V. The couple had three sons: Alfred, Leonard (who died in 1917 when H.M.S. Natal exploded) and Reginald – who became a physician. His wife died in 1945 and Hale-White died at his home in Oxford on 26 February 1949 aged 91.

Books
Great Doctors of the Nineteenth Century, 1935
Keats as Doctor and Patient, 1938
Materia medica, pharmacology and therapeutics (assisted by Arthur Henry Douthwaite), London, Churchill, 1949, 1959, 1963.
Translation of selected passages from De l'auscultation mediate, Rene Laennec, 1923.

References

External links
Biography
Sketch by Sir William Rothenstein

1857 births
1949 deaths
19th-century English medical doctors
Royal Army Medical Corps officers
British Army personnel of World War I
Knights Commander of the Order of the British Empire
Fellows of the Royal College of Physicians
Presidents of the Royal Society of Medicine
20th-century English medical doctors